Keith Lewis (born March 28, 1989) is an American football cornerback who is currently a free agent. He attended Virginia University of Lynchburg. He signed with the New York Jets after going undrafted in the 2014 NFL Draft. He has also played for the Tampa Bay Buccaneers, Omaha Mammoths, Calgary Stampeders, San Diego Chargers, Kansas City Chiefs and Detroit Lions.

College 
At Marie Sklodowska-Curie Metro High School in Chicago, Lewis amassed over 30 football scholarships and was one of the top players from the region. But with low ACT scores, he didn't get through the NCAA clearinghouse so he enrolled at the College of DuPage, a nearby junior college. He would go on to become an All-American at the junior college but grades were now an issue for him to transfer to a major program. So Lewis stepped away from football for nearly two years in order to get his life in order.

He applied for and got into Harold Washington College, a college in Chicago without a football program. At Harold Washington, the lack of a football program meant that Lewis had the chance to focus on the classroom. He spent more time studying and getting his grades up. Eventually the Virginia University of Lynchburg offered him a scholarship. In his final season at Lynchburg, he began to turn heads and caught the attention of agents and NFL scouts. All of a sudden there was a bit of buzz about this untested, extremely raw prospect.

Professional career

Tampa Bay Buccaneers 
After going undrafted in the 2014 NFL Draft Lewis signed with the Tampa Bay Buccaneers. He was released by the Buccaneers on August 29, 2014 as they trimmed their roster down to 53 players.

Omaha Mammoths 
Lewis played with the Omaha Mammoths of the Fall Experimental Football League (FXFL) during their 2014 season.

New York Jets 
Lewis signed a reserves/futures contract with the New York Jets on December 30, 2014. Lewis was released by the Jets as they trimmed their roster down before the start of the regular season.

Calgary Stampeders 
Signed with the Calgary Stampeders of the Canadian Football League on September 28, 2015.

San Diego Chargers 
The San Diego Chargers and Lewis agreed to a contract on December 16, 2015.

Kansas City Chiefs
Lewis was signed by the Kansas City Chiefs in January 2016 and released by the team in June 2016.

Detroit Lions
Lewis was signed by the Detroit Lions in June 2016 and released by the team in August 2016.

Winnipeg Blue Bombers
On January 24, 2017, Lewis signed with the Winnipeg Blue Bombers.

Illinois Cowboys IA-FL (Iron Athletes Football League)
Lewis was signed June 2017

Carolina Cobras
On February 25, 2018, Lewis signed with the Carolina Cobras of the National Arena League (NAL).

Orlando Predators
On November 26, 2021, Lewis signed with the Orlando Predators of the National Arena League (NAL). On January 31, 2022, Lewis was released by the Predators.

Albany Empire
On February 14, 2022, Lewis signed with the Albany Empire of the National Arena League (NAL).

Carolina Cobras (second stint)
On March 22, 2022, Lewis was traded by the Empire to the Carolina Cobras of the National Arena League (NAL). On April 16, 2022, Lewis was released by the Cobras.

West Texas Warbirds
On October 24, 2022, Lewis signed with the West Texas Warbirds of the National Arena League (NAL). On March 2, 2023, Lewis was released by the Warbirds.

References

External links
 http://www.chargers.com/team/players/roster/keith-lewis

American football cornerbacks
Canadian football defensive backs
American players of Canadian football
Living people
Place of birth missing (living people)
Tampa Bay Buccaneers players
Omaha Mammoths players
New York Jets players
Calgary Stampeders players
San Diego Chargers players
Kansas City Chiefs players
Detroit Lions players
1989 births
Winnipeg Blue Bombers players
Carolina Cobras (NAL) players